Poamsan is one of the Sobaek Mountains of central South Korea. To the southwest of its principal peak, Poam mountain descends to the low pass of Haneuljae.    

Much of Poam Mountain is now contained in Woraksan National Park.  Its lower slopes contain a number of important cultural artifacts, many of which are linked to the role of Haneuljae as a key transit route in the Silla and Goryeo periods.  For example, the site of the Goryeo-era Buddhist temple of Mireuksa is located in Mireung-ni, Chungju City.  The site of the Silla-era Buddhist temple of in Gwaneum-ni, Mungyeong-eup, Mungyeong City.  Stone pagodas and sculptures from these long-abandoned temples, which appear to have played a double role as temples and traveller's hostels, can still be found at the sites.

See also
 List of mountains in Korea
 Geography of South Korea

References
Seo, Y.-i. (2001).  신라 육상 교통로 계립령 (Silla yuksang gyotongno gyerimnyeong / Gyerimnyeong, land transportation route of Silla.)  In Mungyeong Saejae Museum (Ed.), 길 위의 역사, 고개의 문화 (Gil wi-ui yeoksa, gogae-ui munhwa / The history upon the road, the culture of the passes), pp. 129–150.  Seoul:  Silcheon Munhak.

Mountains of South Korea
Mungyeong
Chungju